The 1935 VFL season was the 39th season of the Victorian Football League (VFL), the highest level senior Australian rules football competition in Victoria. The season featured twelve clubs, ran from 27 April until 5 October, and comprised an 18-game home-and-away season followed by a finals series featuring the top four clubs.

The premiership was won by the Collingwood Football Club for the tenth time, after it defeated  by 20 points in the 1935 VFL Grand Final.

Premiership season
In 1935, the VFL competition consisted of twelve teams of 18 on-the-field players each, plus one substitute player, known as the 19th man. A player could be substituted for any reason; however, once substituted, a player could not return to the field of play under any circumstances.

Teams played each other in a home-and-away season of 18 rounds; matches 12 to 18 were the "home-and-way reverse" of matches 1 to 7.

Once the 18 round home-and-away season had finished, the 1935 VFL Premiers were determined by the specific format and conventions of the Page–McIntyre system.

Round 1

|- bgcolor="#CCCCFF"
| Home team
| Home team score
| Away team
| Away team score
| Venue
| Crowd
| Date
|- bgcolor="#FFFFFF"
| 
| 7.19 (61)
| 
| 14.12 (96)
| Western Oval
| 17,000
| 27 April 1935
|- bgcolor="#FFFFFF"
| 
| 15.18 (108)
| 
| 15.16 (106)
| Victoria Park
| 30,000
| 27 April 1935
|- bgcolor="#FFFFFF"
| 
| 14.18 (102)
| 
| 15.18 (108)
| Princes Park
| 23,000
| 27 April 1935
|- bgcolor="#FFFFFF"
| 
| 12.11 (83)
| 
| 14.3 (87)
| Arden Street Oval
| 7,000
| 27 April 1935
|- bgcolor="#FFFFFF"
| 
| 11.14 (80)
| 
| 14.8 (92)
| Junction Oval
| 21,000
| 27 April 1935
|- bgcolor="#FFFFFF"
| 
| 15.9 (99)
| 
| 24.15 (159)
| MCG
| 15,615
| 27 April 1935

Round 2

|- bgcolor="#CCCCFF"
| Home team
| Home team score
| Away team
| Away team score
| Venue
| Crowd
| Date
|- bgcolor="#FFFFFF"
| 
| 14.20 (104)
| 
| 16.6 (102)
| Corio Oval
| 11,000
| 4 May 1935
|- bgcolor="#FFFFFF"
| 
| 13.17 (95)
| 
| 13.14 (92)
| Windy Hill
| 21,500
| 4 May 1935
|- bgcolor="#FFFFFF"
| 
| 14.11 (95)
| 
| 10.12 (72)
| Punt Road Oval
| 14,000
| 4 May 1935
|- bgcolor="#FFFFFF"
| 
| 17.11 (113)
| 
| 15.9 (99)
| Lake Oval
| 28,000
| 4 May 1935
|- bgcolor="#FFFFFF"
| 
| 14.9 (93)
| 
| 14.9 (93)
| Brunswick Street Oval
| 36,000
| 6 May 1935
|- bgcolor="#FFFFFF"
| 
| 9.6 (60)
| 
| 14.27 (111)
| Glenferrie Oval
| 23,000
| 6 May 1935

Round 3

|- bgcolor="#CCCCFF"
| Home team
| Home team score
| Away team
| Away team score
| Venue
| Crowd
| Date
|- bgcolor="#FFFFFF"
| 
| 5.14 (44)
| 
| 13.11 (89)
| Arden Street Oval
| 12,500
| 11 May 1935
|- bgcolor="#FFFFFF"
| 
| 21.17 (143)
| 
| 12.11 (83)
| Victoria Park
| 18,000
| 11 May 1935
|- bgcolor="#FFFFFF"
| 
| 11.11 (77)
| 
| 10.8 (68)
| Princes Park
| 35,000
| 11 May 1935
|- bgcolor="#FFFFFF"
| 
| 15.19 (109)
| 
| 11.13 (79)
| MCG
| 7,788
| 11 May 1935
|- bgcolor="#FFFFFF"
| 
| 18.20 (128)
| 
| 18.15 (123)
| Junction Oval
| 19,000
| 11 May 1935
|- bgcolor="#FFFFFF"
| 
| 7.13 (55)
| 
| 9.12 (66)
| Western Oval
| 20,000
| 11 May 1935

Round 4

|- bgcolor="#CCCCFF"
| Home team
| Home team score
| Away team
| Away team score
| Venue
| Crowd
| Date
|- bgcolor="#FFFFFF"
| 
| 6.17 (53)
| 
| 16.8 (104)
| Glenferrie Oval
| 11,000
| 18 May 1935
|- bgcolor="#FFFFFF"
| 
| 18.16 (124)
| 
| 10.14 (74)
| Brunswick Street Oval
| 13,000
| 18 May 1935
|- bgcolor="#FFFFFF"
| 
| 18.20 (128)
| 
| 14.8 (92)
| Punt Road Oval
| 15,000
| 18 May 1935
|- bgcolor="#FFFFFF"
| 
| 7.8 (50)
| 
| 16.5 (101)
| Western Oval
| 17,000
| 18 May 1935
|- bgcolor="#FFFFFF"
| 
| 14.17 (101)
| 
| 17.13 (115)
| Corio Oval
| 13,000
| 18 May 1935
|- bgcolor="#FFFFFF"
| 
| 13.19 (97)
| 
| 14.6 (90)
| Lake Oval
| 35,000
| 18 May 1935

Round 5

|- bgcolor="#CCCCFF"
| Home team
| Home team score
| Away team
| Away team score
| Venue
| Crowd
| Date
|- bgcolor="#FFFFFF"
| 
| 15.10 (100)
| 
| 17.12 (114)
| Corio Oval
| 14,700
| 25 May 1935
|- bgcolor="#FFFFFF"
| 
| 8.9 (57)
| 
| 14.14 (98)
| Brunswick Street Oval
| 35,000
| 25 May 1935
|- bgcolor="#FFFFFF"
| 
| 13.20 (98)
| 
| 12.14 (86)
| Windy Hill
| 10,000
| 25 May 1935
|- bgcolor="#FFFFFF"
| 
| 12.16 (88)
| 
| 13.12 (90)
| Arden Street Oval
| 12,000
| 25 May 1935
|- bgcolor="#FFFFFF"
| 
| 9.15 (69)
| 
| 13.20 (98)
| MCG
| 16,057
| 25 May 1935
|- bgcolor="#FFFFFF"
| 
| 16.14 (110)
| 
| 20.9 (129)
| Junction Oval
| 29,000
| 25 May 1935

Round 6

|- bgcolor="#CCCCFF"
| Home team
| Home team score
| Away team
| Away team score
| Venue
| Crowd
| Date
|- bgcolor="#FFFFFF"
| 
| 23.11 (149)
| 
| 14.14 (98)
| Victoria Park
| 17,500
| 1 June 1935
|- bgcolor="#FFFFFF"
| 
| 14.9 (93)
| 
| 22.19 (151)
| Glenferrie Oval
| 9,500
| 1 June 1935
|- bgcolor="#FFFFFF"
| 
| 23.14 (152)
| 
| 10.11 (71)
| Lake Oval
| 33,000
| 1 June 1935
|- bgcolor="#FFFFFF"
| 
| 15.13 (103)
| 
| 15.20 (110)
| MCG
| 22,711
| 3 June 1935
|- bgcolor="#FFFFFF"
| 
| 12.13 (85)
| 
| 13.9 (87)
| Windy Hill
| 26,000
| 3 June 1935
|- bgcolor="#FFFFFF"
| 
| 20.16 (136)
| 
| 9.14 (68)
| Princes Park
| 20,000
| 3 June 1935

Round 7

|- bgcolor="#CCCCFF"
| Home team
| Home team score
| Away team
| Away team score
| Venue
| Crowd
| Date
|- bgcolor="#FFFFFF"
| 
| 7.17 (59)
| 
| 15.15 (105)
| Punt Road Oval
| 35,000
| 8 June 1935
|- bgcolor="#FFFFFF"
| 
| 14.12 (96)
| 
| 13.8 (86)
| Brunswick Street Oval
| 9,000
| 8 June 1935
|- bgcolor="#FFFFFF"
| 
| 8.11 (59)
| 
| 18.11 (119)
| Arden Street Oval
| 7,000
| 8 June 1935
|- bgcolor="#FFFFFF"
| 
| 16.14 (110)
| 
| 4.12 (36)
| Corio Oval
| 10,000
| 8 June 1935
|- bgcolor="#FFFFFF"
| 
| 16.15 (111)
| 
| 19.16 (130)
| Junction Oval
| 17,000
| 8 June 1935
|- bgcolor="#FFFFFF"
| 
| 12.7 (79)
| 
| 9.25 (79)
| Western Oval
| 15,000
| 8 June 1935

Round 8

|- bgcolor="#CCCCFF"
| Home team
| Home team score
| Away team
| Away team score
| Venue
| Crowd
| Date
|- bgcolor="#FFFFFF"
| 
| 9.23 (77)
| 
| 17.14 (116)
| Glenferrie Oval
| 12,000
| 15 June 1935
|- bgcolor="#FFFFFF"
| 
| 13.12 (90)
| 
| 10.16 (76)
| Corio Oval
| 13,000
| 15 June 1935
|- bgcolor="#FFFFFF"
| 
| 9.7 (61)
| 
| 14.19 (103)
| Windy Hill
| 17,000
| 15 June 1935
|- bgcolor="#FFFFFF"
| 
| 16.30 (126)
| 
| 6.10 (46)
| Victoria Park
| 8,000
| 15 June 1935
|- bgcolor="#FFFFFF"
| 
| 14.10 (94)
| 
| 7.13 (55)
| Junction Oval
| 20,000
| 15 June 1935
|- bgcolor="#FFFFFF"
| 
| 7.12 (54)
| 
| 9.12 (66)
| MCG
| 19,546
| 15 June 1935

Round 9

|- bgcolor="#CCCCFF"
| Home team
| Home team score
| Away team
| Away team score
| Venue
| Crowd
| Date
|- bgcolor="#FFFFFF"
| 
| 6.9 (45)
| 
| 8.14 (62)
| Arden Street Oval
| 4,000
| 22 June 1935
|- bgcolor="#FFFFFF"
| 
| 5.4 (34)
| 
| 4.15 (39)
| Western Oval
| 5,500
| 22 June 1935
|- bgcolor="#FFFFFF"
| 
| 10.5 (65)
| 
| 6.14 (50)
| Brunswick Street Oval
| 8,500
| 22 June 1935
|- bgcolor="#FFFFFF"
| 
| 13.9 (87)
| 
| 8.10 (58)
| Princes Park
| 17,000
| 22 June 1935
|- bgcolor="#FFFFFF"
| 
| 14.7 (91)
| 
| 10.13 (73)
| Punt Road Oval
| 4,000
| 22 June 1935
|- bgcolor="#FFFFFF"
| 
| 13.22 (100)
| 
| 9.7 (61)
| Lake Oval
| 8,000
| 22 June 1935

Round 10

|- bgcolor="#CCCCFF"
| Home team
| Home team score
| Away team
| Away team score
| Venue
| Crowd
| Date
|- bgcolor="#FFFFFF"
| 
| 26.16 (172)
| 
| 15.7 (97)
| Corio Oval
| 7,000
| 29 June 1935
|- bgcolor="#FFFFFF"
| 
| 13.10 (88)
| 
| 15.17 (107)
| Brunswick Street Oval
| 11,000
| 29 June 1935
|- bgcolor="#FFFFFF"
| 
| 13.16 (94)
| 
| 9.15 (69)
| Lake Oval
| 19,000
| 29 June 1935
|- bgcolor="#FFFFFF"
| 
| 12.13 (85)
| 
| 14.6 (90)
| Glenferrie Oval
| 9,000
| 29 June 1935
|- bgcolor="#FFFFFF"
| 
| 11.14 (80)
| 
| 13.4 (82)
| Punt Road Oval
| 25,000
| 29 June 1935
|- bgcolor="#FFFFFF"
| 
| 11.12 (78)
| 
| 22.8 (140)
| Windy Hill
| 18,000
| 29 June 1935

Round 11

|- bgcolor="#CCCCFF"
| Home team
| Home team score
| Away team
| Away team score
| Venue
| Crowd
| Date
|- bgcolor="#FFFFFF"
| 
| 11.12 (78)
| 
| 18.14 (122)
| MCG
| 19,086
| 6 July 1935
|- bgcolor="#FFFFFF"
| 
| 15.13 (103)
| 
| 16.7 (103)
| Western Oval
| 11,000
| 6 July 1935
|- bgcolor="#FFFFFF"
| 
| 17.20 (122)
| 
| 12.3 (75)
| Victoria Park
| 8,000
| 6 July 1935
|- bgcolor="#FFFFFF"
| 
| 19.21 (135)
| 
| 8.6 (54)
| Princes Park
| 24,000
| 6 July 1935
|- bgcolor="#FFFFFF"
| 
| 10.14 (74)
| 
| 7.8 (50)
| Junction Oval
| 20,000
| 6 July 1935
|- bgcolor="#FFFFFF"
| 
| 10.13 (73)
| 
| 10.14 (74)
| Arden Street Oval
| 8,000
| 6 July 1935

Round 12

|- bgcolor="#CCCCFF"
| Home team
| Home team score
| Away team
| Away team score
| Venue
| Crowd
| Date
|- bgcolor="#FFFFFF"
| 
| 16.18 (114)
| 
| 6.10 (46)
| Glenferrie Oval
| 4,000
| 13 July 1935
|- bgcolor="#FFFFFF"
| 
| 9.10 (64)
| 
| 12.12 (84)
| Brunswick Street Oval
| 15,000
| 13 July 1935
|- bgcolor="#FFFFFF"
| 
| 10.14 (74)
| 
| 12.21 (93)
| Windy Hill
| 8,000
| 13 July 1935
|- bgcolor="#FFFFFF"
| 
| 16.10 (106)
| 
| 3.11 (29)
| Punt Road Oval
| 16,000
| 13 July 1935
|- bgcolor="#FFFFFF"
| 
| 18.16 (124)
| 
| 10.11 (71)
| Lake Oval
| 31,000
| 13 July 1935
|- bgcolor="#FFFFFF"
| 
| 6.7 (43)
| 
| 11.10 (76)
| Corio Oval
| 14,500
| 13 July 1935

Round 13

|- bgcolor="#CCCCFF"
| Home team
| Home team score
| Away team
| Away team score
| Venue
| Crowd
| Date
|- bgcolor="#FFFFFF"
| 
| 7.6 (48)
| 
| 15.11 (101)
| Arden Street Oval
| 7,000
| 20 July 1935
|- bgcolor="#FFFFFF"
| 
| 9.8 (62)
| 
| 15.8 (98)
| Western Oval
| 16,000
| 20 July 1935
|- bgcolor="#FFFFFF"
| 
| 14.21 (105)
| 
| 12.10 (82)
| Victoria Park
| 18,000
| 20 July 1935
|- bgcolor="#FFFFFF"
| 
| 21.16 (142)
| 
| 11.10 (76)
| Princes Park
| 12,000
| 20 July 1935
|- bgcolor="#FFFFFF"
| 
| 11.11 (77)
| 
| 6.13 (49)
| MCG
| 12,817
| 20 July 1935
|- bgcolor="#FFFFFF"
| 
| 13.15 (93)
| 
| 11.3 (69)
| Junction Oval
| 16,000
| 20 July 1935

Round 14

|- bgcolor="#CCCCFF"
| Home team
| Home team score
| Away team
| Away team score
| Venue
| Crowd
| Date
|- bgcolor="#FFFFFF"
| 
| 12.10 (82)
| 
| 14.17 (101)
| Glenferrie Oval
| 7,000
| 27 July 1935
|- bgcolor="#FFFFFF"
| 
| 14.16 (100)
| 
| 13.15 (93)
| Brunswick Street Oval
| 13,000
| 27 July 1935
|- bgcolor="#FFFFFF"
| 
| 14.11 (95)
| 
| 11.14 (80)
| Punt Road Oval
| 30,000
| 27 July 1935
|- bgcolor="#FFFFFF"
| 
| 9.14 (68)
| 
| 13.8 (86)
| Corio Oval
| 7,000
| 17 August 1935
|- bgcolor="#FFFFFF"
| 
| 16.13 (109)
| 
| 15.10 (100)
| Lake Oval
| 7,000
| 17 August 1935
|- bgcolor="#FFFFFF"
| 
| 16.10 (106)
| 
| 16.17 (113)
| Windy Hill
| 11,000
| 17 August 1935

Round 15

|- bgcolor="#CCCCFF"
| Home team
| Home team score
| Away team
| Away team score
| Venue
| Crowd
| Date
|- bgcolor="#FFFFFF"
| 
| 15.25 (115)
| 
| 12.10 (82)
| Windy Hill
| 11,000
| 10 August 1935
|- bgcolor="#FFFFFF"
| 
| 22.13 (145)
| 
| 16.15 (111)
| Victoria Park
| 9,000
| 10 August 1935
|- bgcolor="#FFFFFF"
| 
| 16.26 (122)
| 
| 12.9 (81)
| Princes Park
| 40,000
| 10 August 1935
|- bgcolor="#FFFFFF"
| 
| 17.22 (124)
| 
| 9.9 (63)
| Junction Oval
| 9,000
| 10 August 1935
|- bgcolor="#FFFFFF"
| 
| 10.13 (73)
| 
| 12.10 (82)
| Arden Street Oval
| 7,000
| 10 August 1935
|- bgcolor="#FFFFFF"
| 
| 10.8 (68)
| 
| 10.15 (75)
| MCG
| 27,572
| 17 August 1935

Round 16

|- bgcolor="#CCCCFF"
| Home team
| Home team score
| Away team
| Away team score
| Venue
| Crowd
| Date
|- bgcolor="#FFFFFF"
| 
| 8.14 (62)
| 
| 10.9 (69)
| Western Oval
| 7,000
| 24 August 1935
|- bgcolor="#FFFFFF"
| 
| 11.13 (79)
| 
| 10.19 (79)
| Victoria Park
| 10,500
| 24 August 1935
|- bgcolor="#FFFFFF"
| 
| 18.22 (130)
| 
| 16.12 (108)
| Princes Park
| 33,000
| 24 August 1935
|- bgcolor="#FFFFFF"
| 
| 21.12 (138)
| 
| 8.14 (62)
| Lake Oval
| 12,000
| 24 August 1935
|- bgcolor="#FFFFFF"
| 
| 17.16 (118)
| 
| 12.9 (81)
| Punt Road Oval
| 16,500
| 24 August 1935
|- bgcolor="#FFFFFF"
| 
| 8.26 (74)
| 
| 9.12 (66)
| Glenferrie Oval
| 5,000
| 24 August 1935

Round 17

|- bgcolor="#CCCCFF"
| Home team
| Home team score
| Away team
| Away team score
| Venue
| Crowd
| Date
|- bgcolor="#FFFFFF"
| 
| 7.17 (59)
| 
| 13.9 (87)
| Corio Oval
| 2,500
| 31 August 1935
|- bgcolor="#FFFFFF"
| 
| 11.8 (74)
| 
| 10.15 (75)
| Brunswick Street Oval
| 17,000
| 31 August 1935
|- bgcolor="#FFFFFF"
| 
| 19.8 (122)
| 
| 16.14 (110)
| Junction Oval
| 18,000
| 31 August 1935
|- bgcolor="#FFFFFF"
| 
| 12.14 (86)
| 
| 7.16 (58)
| Punt Road Oval
| 13,000
| 31 August 1935
|- bgcolor="#FFFFFF"
| 
| 6.17 (53)
| 
| 12.14 (86)
| Western Oval
| 7,500
| 31 August 1935
|- bgcolor="#FFFFFF"
| 
| 10.9 (69)
| 
| 16.16 (112)
| Arden Street Oval
| 13,000
| 31 August 1935

Round 18

|- bgcolor="#CCCCFF"
| Home team
| Home team score
| Away team
| Away team score
| Venue
| Crowd
| Date
|- bgcolor="#FFFFFF"
| 
| 15.12 (102)
| 
| 7.12 (54)
| MCG
| 5,084
| 7 September 1935
|- bgcolor="#FFFFFF"
| 
| 14.23 (107)
| 
| 11.13 (79)
| Windy Hill
| 6,000
| 7 September 1935
|- bgcolor="#FFFFFF"
| 
| 9.18 (72)
| 
| 7.15 (57)
| Victoria Park
| 16,000
| 7 September 1935
|- bgcolor="#FFFFFF"
| 
| 20.24 (144)
| 
| 10.17 (77)
| Princes Park
| 12,000
| 7 September 1935
|- bgcolor="#FFFFFF"
| 
| 14.23 (107)
| 
| 9.9 (63)
| Lake Oval
| 28,000
| 7 September 1935
|- bgcolor="#FFFFFF"
| 
| 14.26 (110)
| 
| 15.6 (96)
| Glenferrie Oval
| 11,000
| 7 September 1935

Ladder

Finals

All of the 1935 finals were played at the MCG so the home team in the semi-finals and preliminary final is purely the higher ranked team from the ladder but in the Grand Final the home team was the team that won the preliminary final.

Semi-finals

|- bgcolor="#CCCCFF"
| Home team
| Score
| Away team
| Score
| Venue
| Crowd
| Date
|- bgcolor="#FFFFFF"
| 
| 14.20 (104)
| 
| 19.11 (125)
| MCG
| 49,759
| 14 September
|- bgcolor="#FFFFFF"
| 
| 15.14 (104)
| 
| 11.17 (83)
| MCG
| 53,766
| 21 September

Preliminary final

|- bgcolor="#CCCCFF"
| Home team
| Score
| Away team
| Score
| Venue
| Crowd
| Date
|- bgcolor="#FFFFFF"
| 
| 14.10 (94)
| 
| 9.12 (66)
| MCG
| 46,191
| 28 September

Grand Final

Collingwood defeated South Melbourne 11.12 (78) to 7.16 (58), in front of a crowd of 54,154 people. (For an explanation of scoring see Australian rules football).

Awards
 The 1935 VFL Premiership team was Collingwood.
 The VFL's leading goalkicker was Bob Pratt of South Melbourne with 97 goals (103 after finals).
 The winner of the 1935 Brownlow Medal was Haydn Bunton, Sr of Fitzroy with 24 votes.
 North Melbourne took the "wooden spoon" in 1935.
Melbourne defeated  in the Grand Final, played as a curtain-raiser to the firsts Grand Final on 5 October at the Melbourne Cricket Ground.

Notable events
 In February 1935, the VFL advanced an emergency interest-free loan of £500 to the North Melbourne Football Club, which had not won a match since 19 August 1933.
 The VFL experimented with rubber footballs during pre-season practice matches. The experiment was not successful: the balls were found to float far too much in the air, and bounce far too much on the ground.
 Footscray changed their jumper design from the traditional red and white hoops on a blue background to a jumper with vertical red and blue stripes with white piping. Designed to make the club more distinctive, these jumpers were destroyed when dry-cleaned at the end of the season.
 On 30 March, a practice match between Richmond and South Melbourne was played at night, with a white ball, under electric light at Olympic Park.
 On 18 May, 24-year-old Clen Denning played his first VFL senior match. Playing in the forward-pocket for Carlton, against South Melbourne, he kicked a goal with each of his first six kicks in the match.
 In the third quarter of the round 18 match between Essendon and Geelong, Geelong was clawing back Essendon's lead, when the Windy Hill ground was invaded by a swarm of schoolboys. A small balloon had drifted over the ground and had dropped small parachutes and papers, and the schoolboys invaded the ground to capture the "treasures" dropped from the balloon, oblivious of the fact that the match was still in progress. The match was delayed for some time before order was restored. Essendon eventually won the match 14.23 (107) to 11.13 (79).
 At the end of the 1935 season, the Hawthorn Football Club was unable to make any of its contracted payments to its players, many of whom were unemployed and relying on the £3 weekly match fees to sustain their families.
 On Grand Final eve, South Melbourne's champion full-forward Bob Pratt was hit by a brick truck when alighting from a tram. He was replaced in the team by Roy Moore. Neither Moore at full-forward nor Laurie Nash at centre half-forward scored a goal in the match; their opponents were Charlie Dibbs and Jack Regan respectively.

Footnotes

References
 Maplestone, M., Flying Higher: History of the Essendon Football Club 1872–1996, Essendon Football Club, (Melbourne), 1996. 
 Rogers, S. & Brown, A., Every Game Ever Played: VFL/AFL Results 1897–1997 (Sixth Edition), Viking Books, (Ringwood), 1998. 
 Ross, J. (ed), 100 Years of Australian Football 1897–1996: The Complete Story of the AFL, All the Big Stories, All the Great Pictures, All the Champions, Every AFL Season Reported, Viking, (Ringwood), 1996.

External links
 1935 Season – AFL Tables
 1935 Pre-Season Richmond v South Melbourne – Under Lights – BoylesFootballPhotos

Australian Football League seasons
Vfl season